Rudolph C. Cane (born May 23, 1934) is an American politician and member of the Democratic Party. He represented District 37A in the Maryland House of Delegates for 15 years before retiring in 2014. He is the first African American to represent the Eastern Shore in the Maryland House of Delegates. Cane is also a former chairman of the Legislative Black Caucus of Maryland.

Background
Rudolph Cane was born on May 23, 1934 in Marion on the Eastern Shore of Maryland. Delegate Cane graduated from Carter G. Woodson High School in Crisfield, Maryland, in 1952. He entered the United States Army right after high school and served as a radar specialist earning the rank of sergeant by the time of his honorable discharge in 1955. After his military service he pursued undergraduate studies at Maryland State College from 1956 to 1957 and Coppin State College from 1964 to 1968.

In the legislature
A member of House of Delegates from January 13, 1999 to January 2015, Cane most recently served on the House Environmental Matters Committee and its environment, its natural resources and its land use & ethics subcommittees. He was chairman of the committee's agriculture, agriculture preservation & open space subcommittee.

Legislative notes
 Voted for the Clean Indoor Air Act of 2007 (HB359)
 Voted in favor of increasing the sales tax to 6% - Tax Reform Act of 2007(HB2)
 Voted in favor of in-state tuition for illegal immigrants in 2007 (HB6)
 Sponsored House Bill 30 in 2007, allowing the state to confiscate unused portions of gift certificates after 4 years.

Personal life 
In December 2015, Cane reportedly suffered a stroke.

References

External links

Democratic Party members of the Maryland House of Delegates
1934 births
Living people
African-American United States Army personnel
People from Crisfield, Maryland
People from Wicomico County, Maryland
21st-century American politicians
21st-century African-American politicians
20th-century African-American people